Stadion Feijenoord, more commonly known by its nickname De Kuip (the Tub), is a stadium in Rotterdam, Netherlands. It was completed in 1937. The name is derived from the Feijenoord district in Rotterdam, and from the club with the same name (although the club's name was internationalised to Feyenoord in 1973).

The stadium's original capacity was 64,000. In 1949, it was expanded to 69,000, and in 1994 it was converted to a 51,117-seat all-seater. In 1999, a significant amount of restoration and interior work took place at the stadium prior to its use as a venue in the UEFA Euro 2000 tournament, although capacity was largely unaffected.

History

Leen van Zandvliet, Feyenoord's president in the 1930s, came up with the idea of building an entirely new stadium, unlike any other on the continent, with two free hanging tiers and no obstacles blocking the view. Contemporary examples were Highbury, where the West and East stands had been recently built as a double deck, and Yankee Stadium in New York. Johannes Brinkman and Leendert van der Vlugt, the famous designers of the Van Nelle factory in Rotterdam were asked to design a stadium out of glass, concrete and steel, cheap materials at that time. The stadium was co-financed by the billionaire Daniël George van Beuningen, who made his fortune in World War I, exporting coal from Germany to Britain through neutral Netherlands.

In World War II, the stadium was nearly torn down for scrap by German occupiers. After the war, the stadium's capacity was expanded in 1949; stadium lights were added in 1958. On 29 October 1991, De Kuip was named as being one of Rotterdam's monuments. In 1994 the stadium was extensively renovated to its present form: It became all-seater, and the roof was extended to cover all the seats. An extra building was constructed for commercial use by Feyenoord, it also houses a restaurant and a museum, The Home of History.

Facilities and related buildings
Next to De Kuip and Feyenoord's training ground there is another, but smaller, sports arena, the Topsportcentrum Rotterdam. This arena hosts events in many sports and in various levels of competition. Some examples of sports that can be seen in the topsportcentrum are judo, volleyball and handball.

Commercial uses

Football history
De Kuip is currently the home stadium of football club Feyenoord, one of the traditional top teams in the Netherlands. It has also long been one of the home grounds of the Netherlands national football team, having hosted over 150 international matches, with the first one being a match against Belgium on 2 May 1937. In 1963, De Kuip staged the final of the European Cup Winners' Cup, with Tottenham Hotspur becoming the first British club to win a European trophy, defeating Atlético Madrid 5–1. A record ten European finals have taken place in the stadium, the last one being the 2002 UEFA Cup Final in which Feyenoord, coincidentally playing a home match, defeated Borussia Dortmund 3–2. As a result, Feyenoord holds the distinction of being the only club to win a one-legged European final in their own stadium. In 2000, the Feijenoord stadium hosted the final of Euro 2000, played in the Netherlands and Belgium, where France defeated Italy 2–1 in extra time.

Concerts
The stadium has hosted concerts since 1978. Among the first performers at De Kuip were Bruce Springsteen and Eric Clapton. David Bowie held his dress rehearsals and subsequently opened his 1987 Glass Spider Tour at the stadium.

New stadium
Since 2006, Feyenoord has been working on plans for a new stadium, initially planned for 2017 completion and an estimated capacity for 85,000 people. In 2014, Feyenoord decided to renovate the stadium, making it a 70,000 seater with a retractable roof. Building was planned to start in summer 2015, and finish in 2018 with total costs of an estimated €200 million. Part of the plan was a new training facility, costing an extra €16 million.

In March 2016, Feyenoord announced that they instead preferred building a new stadium. In May 2017, the city of Rotterdam agreed with a plan to build a new stadium with a capacity of 63,000 seats. In December 2019, Feyenoord announced that if construction of the new stadium was given in the final go-ahead in 2020 the stadium will open its doors in the summer of 2025.
On 21 of April 2022 managing director Dennis te Kloesse announced that the club (for now) will not proceed with either renovating nor building a new stadium.

Euro 2000

Average attendance numbers per season, 1937–2007

Gallery

See also
 List of stadiums
 UEFA

References

External links

 De Kuip Official Website
 De Kuip at Footballmatch.de
 Aerial photo (Google Maps)
 3D format on Google Earth 

Feyenoord
Sports venues in Rotterdam
Rijksmonuments in Rotterdam
Football venues in the Netherlands
UEFA Euro 2000 stadiums in the Netherlands
UEFA European Championship final stadiums
Sports venues completed in 1937
1937 establishments in the Netherlands
20th-century architecture in the Netherlands